Hadhramaut or Hadramawt or Hadramout  ( Ḥaḍramawt) is a governorate of Yemen. Lying within the large historical region of Hadhramaut, it is the country's largest governorate.

The capital of Hadhramut is the city of Mukalla. Other cities in Hadhramaut include the historical towns of Shibam, Sena, Seiyun, Tarim, and Ash Shihr.

The Socotra Archipelago was transferred from the Adan Governorate to the Hadhramaut Governorate in 2004. It was subsequently separated to form the newly created Soqatra Governorate in December 2013.

Geography

Adjacent governorates

 Al Mahrah Governorate (east)
 Al Jawf Governorate (west)
 Marib Governorate (west)
 Shabwah Governorate (south and west)

Districts

Hadhramaut Governorate is divided into the following 28 districts, after the creation of Socotra Governorate on December 2013. These districts are further divided into sub-districts, and then further subdivided into villages:

 Ad Dis District
 Adh Dhlia'ah District
 Al Abr District
 Mukalla District
 Mukalla City District
 Al Qaf District
 Al Qatn District
 Amd District
 Ar Raydah Wa Qusayar District
 As Sawm District
 Ash Shihr District
 Brom Mayfa District
 Daw'an District
 Ghayl Ba Wazir District
 Ghayl Bin Yamin District
 Hagr As Sai'ar District
 Hajr District
 Hawrah District
 Huraidhah District
 Rakhyah District
 Rumah District
 Sah District
 Sayun District
 Shibam District
 Tarim District
 Thamud District
 Yabuth District
 Zamakh wa Manwakh District

Two districts have formed the new Socotra Governorate since December 2013:

 Hidaybu District
 Qulensya Wa Abd Al Kuri District

Villages

See also
 Hadhramaut Mountains

References

 
Governorates of Yemen